Laal is a musical band from Pakistan known for singing socialist and progressive political songs, especially on the poetry written by leftist Urdu poets such as Faiz Ahmed Faiz and Habib Jalib.

Band members
 Shahram Azhar (Former Member)- Guitar and Vocals
 Taimur Rahman- Guitar and Vocals
 Mahvash Waqar- Backup Vocals
 Haider Rahman- Flute

Discography
The debut album is titled Umeed e Sahar and has been released by Fire Records (owned by Geo TV). The second album is titled "Utho Meri Dunya" and has been released by Times Music in India (2012) and Fire Records in Pakistan (2013).

Albums

 Umeed-e-Sahar (2009)
 Main Nay Kaha (Musheer)
 Umeed-e-Sahar
 Sadaa
 Jaag Punjab
 Dastoor
 Kal, Aaj Aur Kal
 Zulmat
 Mat Samjho
 Na Judaa
 Jaago
 Utho Meri Duniya (2012/2013)
 Utho Meri Duniya
 Fareeda
 Jhoot Ka Uncha Sar
 Meray Dil, Meray Musafir
 Bay Dam
 Chah Ka Ilzaam
 Deshatgardi Murdabad
 Ghum Na Kar
 Na Honay Paee
 Yaad

Controversy
It was reported on 6 June 2014 that the official Facebook page of the band has been blocked by the Facebook at the request of the Pakistan Telecommunication Authority. Taimur Rahman, the vocalist and guitarist of the band, said: “The ban was out of the blue and very shameful, there was no controversial entry in the past week that deserved a ban on the page. Our short comments on news clippings we post are usually those that are objected to by the majority of people.” The page, however, was restored later. Pakistan Telecommunication Authority, on other hand, denied that they requested for blocking.

See also 
 List of Pakistani music bands

References

External links
 Laal's Official Facebook Page

Political music groups
Pakistani musical groups
Pakistani socialists
Pakistani communists
Musical groups established in 2008
Musical groups from Lahore